(Catalina) is an Oort cloud comet discovered on 31 October 2013 by the Catalina Sky Survey at an apparent magnitude of 19 using a  Schmidt–Cassegrain telescope. From September 2015 to February 2016 the comet was around apparent magnitude 6. The comet  took around a million years to complete half an orbit from its furthest distance in the Oort cloud and should be ejected from the Solar System over many millions of years.

Overview
When discovered on 31 October 2013 observations from another object from 12 September 2013 were used in the preliminary orbit determination giving an incorrect solution that suggested an orbital period of only 6 years. But by 6 November 2013 a longer observation arc from 14 August until 4 November made it apparent that the first solution had the wrong object from 12 September.

By early May 2015 the comet was around apparent magnitude 12 and had an elongation of 60 degrees from the Sun as it moved further into the southern hemisphere. The comet came to solar conjunction on 6 November 2015 when the comet was around magnitude 6. The comet came to perihelion (closest approach to the Sun) on 15 November 2015 at a distance of 0.82 AU from the Sun. It crossed the celestial equator on 17 December 2015 becoming a northern hemisphere object. On 17 January 2016 the comet passed  from Earth and was around magnitude 6 while located in the constellation of Ursa Major.

 is dynamically new. It came from the Oort cloud with a loosely bound chaotic orbit that was easily perturbed by galactic tides and passing stars. Before entering the planetary region (epoch 1950),  had an orbital period of several million years. After leaving the planetary region (epoch 2050), it will be on an ejection trajectory. The Sun's escape velocity at 200 AU is 2.98 km/s and the comet will be going 3.0 km/s at 200 AU from the Sun.

Gallery

References

External links 

 C/2013 US10 (Catalina) at CometBase 
 Forbes - Comet Catalina To Pass By Earth For The Final Time 

20131031
20151115
Oort cloud